Andreas Thomsson (born 27 May 1971) is a Swedish football manager who most recently managed Åtvidabergs FF. He previously managed Östers IF and FC Linköping City.

References

1971 births
Living people
Swedish footballers
Kalmar FF players
Åtvidabergs FF players
Sandefjord Fotball players
Swedish football managers
Åtvidabergs FF managers
Färjestadens GoIF players
Association football forwards
People from Kalmar
Sportspeople from Kalmar County